Hayden, Stone & Co. was a major securities firm founded in 1892 by Charles Hayden and Galen L. Stone.  The firm was acquired by Cogan, Berlind, Weill & Levitt in 1972 and, after its name disappeared in 1979, was part of what would become Shearson/American Express in 1981.

History
In 1892, Clark, Ward, & Co. clerks Charles Hayden (later the benefactor of the Hayden Planetarium) and Galen L. Stone opened a new brokerage house, Hayden, Stone & Co.  While Stone was known for remaining silent, Hayden gained a reputation for quick decisions and mastery of the brokerage business.  Foreseeing the needs of electrification, Hayden made his fortune by investing in copper mining.  The new investment firm prospered, expanding from its Boston base to open a New York City branch in 1906.

In 1970, the prestigious Hayden, Stone found itself in financial trouble along with many other large securities firms.  Hayden, Stone was acquired by Cogan, Berlind, Weill & Levitt (often jokingly referred to as Corned Beef With Lettuce), whose partners included Sandy Weill and Arthur Levitt, and renamed itself CBWL-Hayden, Stone, dropping the CBWL from the name just two years later, allowing Weill to rid himself of the Corned Beef With Lettuce moniker.

The new Hayden Stone, Inc. then completed possibly its most significant acquisition to that point, merging with  Shearson, Hammill & Co.  Once again, Weill chose to adopt the target's branding to become Shearson Hayden Stone.  The Hayden Stone name was finally abandoned in 1979, following the acquisition of Loeb, Rhoades, Hornblower & Co. to form Shearson Loeb Rhoades. Just two years later, in 1981, Weill sold the combined company to American Express to form Shearson/American Express.

At one point, the firm was considered to be the third largest "wire-house" in the country behind only Merrill Lynch and Bache & Co.

Acquisition history
The following is an illustration of the company's major mergers and acquisitions and historical predecessors (this is not a comprehensive list):

Notable alumni
Peter A. Cohen, former CEO of Shearson Lehman Hutton and current CEO of the Cowen Group
Richard Donchian, commodities and futures trader, and pioneer in the field of managed futures
Charles Hayden, founder
Amos Hostetter Sr., noted trader and co-founder of Commodities Corporation
Joseph P. Kennedy Sr., businessman and political figure, patriarch of the Kennedy family
William O'Neil, American entrepreneur, stockbroker and writer, who founded the business newspaper Investor's Business Daily
Joe Plumeri, Citigroup executive and CEO of the Willis Group
Arthur Rock, venture capitalist
Samuel Howard Sloan
Galen L. Stone, founder
Lou Stone, broker, father of Oliver Stone, director of Wall Street, among others
Frank G. Zarb, former Energy Czar under Gerald Ford and former Chairman of NASDAQ

See also
Wilko v. Swan

References

CREATING A WALL STREET GIANT - For Weill, It's Doubly Sweet Deal.  LA Times, March 13, 1993

External links
Hayden, Stone, & Company Records at Baker Library Special Collections, Harvard Business School

American Express
Defunct financial services companies of the United States
Companies based in New York City
Defunct companies based in New York (state)
Shearson Lehman/American Express
Financial services companies established in 1892
Financial services companies disestablished in 1979
Former investment banks of the United States
1892 establishments in New York (state)
1979 disestablishments in New York (state)